Qin Mi (died 226), courtesy name Zichi, was an official of the state of Shu Han during the Three Kingdoms period of China.

See also
 Lists of people of the Three Kingdoms

References

 Chen, Shou (3rd century). Records of the Three Kingdoms (Sanguozhi).
 Luo, Guanzhong (14th century). Romance of the Three Kingdoms (Sanguo Yanyi).
 Pei, Songzhi (5th century). Annotations to Records of the Three Kingdoms (Sanguozhi zhu).

Year of birth unknown
226 deaths
Shu Han politicians
Officials under Liu Bei
Politicians from Deyang
Han dynasty politicians from Sichuan